NGC 456 is a nebula with an open cluster located in the constellation Tucana. It was discovered on August 1, 1826 by James Dunlop. It was described by Dreyer as "pretty faint, pretty large, irregularly round, mottled but not resolved, 1st of several."

References

0456
18260801
Tucana (constellation)
Open clusters
Small Magellanic Cloud